Sidney Milton Going  (born 19 August 1943) is a former New Zealand rugby union footballer. Dubbed Super Sid by his fans, he played 86 matches, including 29 Tests, for the All Blacks between 1967 and 1977. He represented North Auckland domestically.

Early life and family
Born in Kawakawa, Going was educated at Maromaku Primary School, Northland College and Church College of New Zealand. In 1962, at the age of 19, he was a missionary in Canada for the Church of Jesus Christ of Latter-day Saints (LDS Church). Going and his wife Colleen have five children, among them sons Jared Going who represented New Zealand in Sevens rugby and Milton Going who played super rugby for the Crusaders. Going is also the uncle of All Black Todd Miller and prominent adventurer Pearl Going. Of Māori descent, Going affiliates to the Ngāpuhi and Ngāti Hine iwi.

Career
Many rate him as New Zealand's greatest running halfback, his flair and unpredictability bagging him 10 tries in test matches, and 23 in all All Black games. He was a key member of the 1972–1973 All Blacks touring side to Great Britain and Ireland, his combination with flanker and captain Ian Kirkpatrick was pivotal. The side won tests against Wales, England, and Scotland before being narrowly denied an unprecedented Grand Slam by their 10–10 draw with Ireland.

He was a favourite with Northland (then North Auckland) fans during his long tenure there as halfback from 1965 to 1978, often playing alongside his brothers Ken and Brian, and in New Zealand Māori sides. The brothers' speciality was a blindside triple-scissors movement, which almost gave Northland a late victory in the 1971 match against the touring British Lions. That side featured the Welsh great Gareth Edwards, whose duels with Going were a feature of the tour, which produced for the Lions their first test series victory over the All Blacks. Going was awarded the Tom French Cup for Māori player of the year a record six times; earning the accolade consecutively from 1967 to 1972.

Going was a member of the 1976 All Blacks touring side to South Africa, his team experiencing a 3–1 series loss to the Springboks. Although only a part-time goal-kicker, Going performed this task during the test matches because of injuries to other players. His All Black career finished during the 1977 British Lions tour to New Zealand, when he was replaced after the second of four scheduled test matches.

In the 1977 New Year Honours, Going was appointed a Member of the Order of the British Empire, for services to rugby. He retired from first-class rugby in 1978, but continued his involvement with the game, coaching Northland secondary school teams from 1988 to 1992, and being selector–coach of the first-class side from 1993 to 1996.

In 1978, Bob Howitt wrote a biography of Going entitled Super Sid – The Story of a Great All Black.

In the 2020 Halberg Awards, Going was inducted into the New Zealand Sports Hall of Fame.

The Church of Jesus Christ of Latter-day Saints church service
He was a bishop in the church for seven years.

References

External links
 
 

1943 births
New Zealand international rugby union players
Living people
New Zealand rugby union players
Rugby union scrum-halves
Māori All Blacks players
People educated at the Church College of New Zealand
New Zealand Members of the Order of the British Empire
Ngāti Hine people
Ngāpuhi people
New Zealand Mormon missionaries
20th-century Mormon missionaries
Mormon missionaries in Canada
Temple presidents and matrons (LDS Church)
New Zealand leaders of the Church of Jesus Christ of Latter-day Saints
Northland rugby union players
People educated at Northland College, Kaikohe
New Zealand rugby union coaches